Tunay na Tunay: Gets Mo? Gets Ko! (English: Very Real: Get It? I Get It!) is a 2000 Filipino action and romantic comedy film by Star Cinema and directed by Joyce Bernal in her first action directorial film. It stars Robin Padilla and Jolina Magdangal in their first and only film together. It is also Magdangal's first and only action film to date and her first film without Marvin Agustin which team-up led a series of film and television projects prior to the release of this film.

Synopsis
Nick (Robin Padilla) is an undercover police officer who is in a mission that gone hay-wired when his cover was blown. In his attempt for survival, he stumbled upon a restaurant owned by a Chinese businessman where he met Tin Tin (Jolina Magdangal), a Chinese waitress. To remain inconspicuous from the bad cops and the syndicate he is pursuing, Nick kept a low profile by accepting the offer of the Chinese businessman to work for him as a cook, and later accepted a small task from another Chinese businessman, Mr. Li (Roldan Aquino), to search for the latter's missing daughter, Mei Ling (also Jolina Magdangal).

Nick later discovers that Mei Ling is hiding by the name Tin Tin to escape a marriage her father has arranged with the son of another Chinese businessman Mr. Wong (Vic Diaz), who turns out to be the head of the syndicate Nick is pursuing in his earlier mission.

Cast

Main
 Robin Padilla as Nicanor "Nick" Abeleda /Ramon/Edgar/Abner
 Jolina Magdangal as Tin Tin/Mei Ling

Supporting
 Vic Diaz as Mr. Wong
 Efren Reyes as Don Julio
 Roldan Aquino as Mr. Li
 Dindo Arroyo as Kaliwete
 Bearwin Meily as Dick
 J.R. Herrera as Empoy
 Via Veloso as Beth
 Dang Cruz as Edith
 Levi Ignacio as Chung Lao

Reception
The film was critically and commercially successful and was one of Star Cinema's moneymaker films for the year 2000. It held the record as the highest-grossing Filipino film for the year 2000 for a short time until Minsan, Minahal Kita, and thereafter Anak, were released later that year. For the film's box office success, Robin Padilla was crowned Box Office King of Philippine Movies while Jolina Magdangal received the citation Princess of RP Movies in the 30th Box Office Entertainment Awards.

Soundtrack
 Mahal Ka Sa Akin
 Composer: Vehnee Saturno
 Arranger: Dennis Quila
 Performer: Jolina Magdangal

References

Philippine action comedy films
Star Cinema films
2000 films
Filipino-language films
2000s Mandarin-language films
2000 action comedy films
Films directed by Joyce Bernal